Have a Good Time for Me is the third studio album by the singer-songwriter Jonathan Edwards, released in 1973. Unlike his previous two albums, Have a Good Time for Me contained no original new material from Edwards, but covers of songs by Jimmie Rodgers, Joe Dolce, Malcolm McKinney and Eric Lilljequist. The result was the most country album Jonathan had released to date.

Track listing
 "Have Yourself a Good Time for Me" (Eric Lilljequist)
 "King of Hearts" (Joe Dolce)
 "Places I've Been" (Eric Lilljequist)
 "I'm Alone" (Eric Lilljequist)
 "Travelin' Blues" (Jimmie Rodgers, Shelly Lee Alley)
 "Rollin' Along" (Joe Dolce)
 "My Home Ain't in the Hall of Fame" (Joe Dolce)
 "Angelina" (Malcolm McKinney)
 "Thirty Miles to Go" (Malcolm McKinney)
 "Sit Down Rock and Roll Man" (Eric Lilljequist)
 "When the Roll Is Called Up Yonder" (James Milton Black)

Personnel
Jonathan Edwards – acoustic guitar, harmonica, tambourine, vocals, chorus (on "When the Roll is Called Up Yonder")
Stuart Schulman – electric bass guitar, violin, piano ("King of Hearts" and "I'm Alone"), chorus (on "When the Roll is Called Up Yonder")
Bill Keith – banjo, pedal steel guitar, chorus (on "When the Roll is Called Up Yonder")
Bill Elliott – piano, organ, chorus (on "When the Roll is Called Up Yonder")
George Grantham – drums, vibes, harmony (on "Hall of Fame")
Richard Davis – acoustic double bass 
David Bromberg – mandolin (on "Traveling Blues", dobro (on "Rolling' Along"), electric guitar (on "Hall of Fame")
Al Anderson – electric guitar (on "Places I've Been" and "30 Miles to Go")
Eric Lilljequist – harmony (on "Places I've Been", "Hall of Fame" and "30 Miles to Go"), chorus (on "When the Roll is Called Up Yonder")

Non-performing personnel
Keith Spring – string arrangements, conductor  
Jay Messina – engineer
Kristine Weaver – photography
Ann Christopher – album design
Jonathan Edwards – lettering

References

1973 albums
Albums recorded at Record Plant (New York City)
Atco Records albums
Jonathan Edwards (musician) albums